New Hampshire Public Radio (NHPR) is the National Public Radio member network serving the state of New Hampshire. NHPR is based in Concord and operates eight transmitters and six translators covering nearly the whole state, as well as portions of Massachusetts, Vermont and Maine. The network airs NPR news and talk shows on weekdays and a mix of cultural and music programs on weekends.

NHPR's news staff of 21 is one of the largest in the state and is the only statewide source of radio news.

History and listenership
NHPR's original station, WEVO, signed on from Concord on August 4, 1981. It was originally known as "Granite State Public Radio," after New Hampshire's state nickname. Prior to its sign-on, New Hampshire was one of the few states in New England without a clear signal from an NPR station.

WEVO had 500 members at its start. Over several years the station grew in size. In 1991, the newly renamed NHPR began broadcasting 24 hours a day, seven days a week. Between 1992 and 2011, six other stations joined the network. In 1995 NHPR launched The Exchange, hosted by former NPR reporter Laura Knoy.

Until 2000, NHPR broadcast a mix of NPR news and classical music. However, in 2000 it switched its weekday schedule to all news and talk.

In spring 2007 NHPR had a weekly audience of 161,100 listeners and about 16,000 contributing members. It had an annual budget of $4.5 million, with contributions from listeners, local businesses, grants and funding from the Corporation for Public Broadcasting. Contributions from listeners and businesses in New Hampshire make up more than 90 percent of NHPR's revenue. NHPR does not receive funding from the state of New Hampshire.

In 2014, NHPR bought WCNH, a classical music station. Since WCNH operates at only 190 watts, it is simulcast on WEVO's second HD channel.

In 2017, NHPR reported over 190,000 weekly listeners and 200,000 monthly unique website viewers.

Stations

Notes:

Translators

Programming

At first, NHPR broadcast a mixed format of news and information programming from NPR during drive times, and music mid-days, evenings, and overnights. As has been the case with most other NPR member stations over the past decade and a half, the network dropped music programming (except for a handful of weekend features) by 2001 to carry news and information programming around the clock.

Local staff produces three hours each day of newscasts and feature reports on local New Hampshire news and two daily interview programs. The Exchange, hosted by Laura Knoy, was a one-hour morning news and public affairs call-in show. Word of Mouth, hosted by Justine Paradis, was a one-hour midday general topics interview show. NHPR also locally produces The Folk Show, a live show featuring performances by local musicians, on Sunday evenings and hosted by Kate McNally.

NHPR broadcasts the major daily news programs produced by NPR, including Morning Edition and All Things Considered. The statewide network also broadcasts programming from American Public Media, including Live from Here and Marketplace, as well as programs from Public Radio International, including Studio 360, The Takeaway, This American Life. NHPR also airs programming from international broadcasters, such as As It Happens, the BBC World Service from Britain.

Writers on a New England Stage
NHPR, in conjunction with the Portsmouth Music Hall, has produced a series on New England writers and authors. So far the series has had such authors as John Updike (Terrorist), Doris Kearns Goodwin, Dan Brown (The Da Vinci Code), Alan Alda, and Mitch Albom. Virginia Prescott of Word of Mouth is the interviewer, and the trio Dreadnaught is the house band. The River Run Bookstore in Portsmouth is also affiliated.

See also Writers on a New England Stage at the Music Hall's website

Notable employees
Mark Handley, NHPR's General Manager from 1990 to 2005, was chairman of NPR's Board of Directors for two terms.
Eric Westervelt, formerly a foreign correspondent for NPR who often reported on the Arab-Israeli conflict, was a reporter and news director at NHPR for several years.
Sally Hirsh-Dickinson, New Hampshire Public Radio Producer and Host, Professor of English at Rivier University.

References

External links
NHPR's official website
NHPR's program schedule

American radio networks
NPR member networks
Radio stations established in 1981